Taban Air Flight 6437 was a scheduled domestic flight that crashed on landing at Mashhad, Iran on 24 January 2010. All 170 people escaped from the burning aircraft without loss of life. Most of the passengers were pilgrims returning from visiting holy sites in Iraq.

Aircraft
The aircraft involved was a Tupolev Tu-154M. It was registered RA-85787. The aircraft first flew in 1993.

Accident
Flight 6437 was being operated by Kolavia on behalf of Taban Air. It had originated at Abadan and had diverted to Isfahan due to poor visibility at Mashhad. Once visibility improved, the aircraft took off again, but the visibility deteriorated before Flight 6437 could land. The flight was holding near Mashhad International Airport when a passenger fell seriously ill. The crew were told and they declared a medical emergency. They decided to land at Mashhad on an ILS approach for runway 31R despite the low visibility. During the landing the tail struck the ground causing the aircraft to veer off the runway, the nose gear to collapse, the right wing to strike the ground, and a fire. All passengers and crew survived the accident with 47 receiving injuries. The METAR in force at the time of the accident was OIMM 240350Z 00000KT 0200 FG VV002 02/02 Q1021 A3017.

Investigation
The Iranian Civil Aviation Authority opened an investigation into the accident. On 26 January 2010, it was reported that Russia's Interstate Aviation Committee had joined the investigation.

The final accident report was released on 28 December 2012, listing the sole cause as pilot error.

References

External links
"Taban Air Tupolev Tu-154M RA-85787 crashes and burns in Mashhad, Iran." Seattle Post-Intelligencer.

Aviation accidents and incidents in 2010
2010 in Iran
Aviation accidents and incidents in Iran
Accidents and incidents by airline of Iran
Accidents and incidents involving the Tupolev Tu-154
Mashhad
Taban Air
January 2010 events in Iran
Airliner accidents and incidents caused by pilot error